Ronald Edward Cuber (December 25, 1941 – October 7, 2022) was an American jazz saxophonist. He also played in Latin, pop, rock, and blues sessions. In addition to his primary instrument, baritone sax, he played tenor sax, soprano sax, clarinet, and flute, the latter on an album by Eddie Palmieri as well as on his own recordings. As a leader, Cuber was known for hard bop and Latin jazz. As a side man, he had played with  B. B. King, Paul Simon, and Eric Clapton. Cuber can be heard on Freeze Frame by the J. Geils Band, and one of his most spirited performances is on Dr. Lonnie Smith's 1970 Blue Note album Drives. He was also a member of the Saturday Night Live Band.

Cuber was in Marshall Brown's Newport Youth Band in 1959, where he switched from tenor to baritone sax. His first notable work was with Slide Hampton (1962) and Maynard Ferguson (1963–1965). Then from 1966 to 1967, Cuber worked with George Benson. He was also a member of the Lee Konitz nonet from 1977 to 1979.

Cuber played with Frank Zappa on the live album Zappa in New York, which was recorded in 1976. He was a member of the Mingus Big Band from its inception in the early 1990 until his death. He was an off-screen musician for the movie Across the Universe.

Cuber died on October 7, 2022, at the age of 80.

Discography

As leader
 1976: Cuber Libre! (Xanadu)
 1978: The Eleventh Day of Aquarius (Xanadu)
 1981: New York Jazz
 1985: Two Brothers (AMG)
 1985: Passion Fruit (Electric Bird/PID)
 1986: Pin Point (Electric Bird/PID)
 1986: Live at the Blue Note (ProJazz)
 1992: Cubism (Fresh Sound)
 1993: The Scene Is Clean (Milestone)
 1994: Airplay (SteepleChase)
 1996: In a New York Minute (SteepleChase)
 1997: N.Y.C.ats (SteepleChase)
 1998: Love for Sale (with the Netherlands Metropole Orchestra) (Koch)
 2009: Ronnie (SteepleChase)
 2011: Boplicity (SteepleChase)
 2013: Live at JazzFest Berlin (SteepleChase) recorded 2008
 2018  Ronnie's Trio (SteepleChase)
 2019  Four (SteepleChase)

As sideman
With Patti Austin
 End of a Rainbow (CTI, 1976)
 Havana Candy (CTI, 1977)
With George Benson
 It's Uptown (1966)
 The George Benson Cookbook (1966)
 Good King Bad (CTI, 1975)
With Nick Brignola
 Burn Brigade (Bee Hive, 1979)
With Maynard Ferguson
 The New Sounds of Maynard Ferguson (Cameo, 1963)
 Come Blow Your Horn (Cameo, 1963)
 Color Him Wild (Mainstream, 1965)
With David Clayton-Thomas
 David Clayton-Thomas (1972)
With The Gadd Gang
 The Gadd Gang (Columbia, 1986)
 Here & Now (Columbia, 1988)
 Live at the Bottom Line (A Touch 1994)
With Grant Green
 The Main Attraction (1976)
With Billy Joel
 An Innocent Man (1983)
 The Bridge (1986)
With Sam Jones
 Something New (Interplay, 1979)
With Lee Konitz
 Lee Konitz Nonet (Chiaroscuro, 1977)
 Yes, Yes, Nonet (SteepleChase, 1979)
 Live at Laren (Soul Note, 1979 [1984])
With Jimmy McGriff
 Feelin' It (Milestone, 2001)
 McGriff Avenue (Milestone, 2002)
With Idris Muhammad
 House of the Rising Sun (1976)
 Turn This Mutha Out (1977)
With Horace Silver
 The Hardbop Grandpop (1996)
With Lonnie Smith
 Move Your Hand (Blue Note, 1969)
 Drives (Blue Note, 1970)
 Live at Club Mozambique (Blue Note, 1970; released 1995)
With Mickey Tucker
 Sojourn (Xanadu, 1977)
With Gerald Wilson
 Detroit (Mack Avenue, 2009)
With Rare Silk
 New Weave (1986)
With Randy Brecker
 34th N Lex (2003)
With Dr. John
 Duke Elegant (1999)
With Paul Simon
 Graceland (1986)
With Tom Scott
 Bebop United (2006)
With Eddie Palmieri
 Harlem River Drive  (Roulette, 1971)
 Vamonos Pa'l Monte (Tico, 1971)
 Live at Sing Sing Vol. 1 & 2 (Tico, 1972)
 The Sun of Latin Music (Coco Records, 1975)
 Unfinished Masterpiece (Coco Records, 1976)
 Lucumí, Macumba, Voodoo (Epic, 1978)
 Wisdom/Sabiduria (Ropeadope Records, 2017)

References

External links 
A site with information on all the great Jazz Baritone Saxophonists and vintage horns
 
 

1941 births
2022 deaths
Hard bop saxophonists
Jazz baritone saxophonists
American jazz baritone saxophonists
American jazz tenor saxophonists
American male saxophonists
American jazz soprano saxophonists
American jazz flautists
Musicians from New York City
Xanadu Records artists
SteepleChase Records artists
Milestone Records artists
Jazz musicians from New York (state)
21st-century American saxophonists
American male jazz musicians
White Elephant Orchestra members
Mingus Big Band members
21st-century American male musicians
MNRK Music Group artists
21st-century flautists